Smooth is an album by the American musician Gerald Albright, released in 1994.

The album peaked at No. 151 on the Billboard 200. It was nominated for a Soul Train Music Award, in the "Best Jazz Album" category. Albright supported the album by playing the 1995 Hampton Jazz Festival.

Production
Albright strove to create an R&B album; in addition to saxophone, he also played flute and keyboards. Vesta Williams, Lalah Hathaway, and Will Downing are among the many vocalists on the album. Howard Hewett sang on the cover of "This Is for the Lover in You". Stanley Clarke played bass on "Sedona". The liner notes were written by Magic Johnson.

Critical reception

The Los Angeles Times wrote that "Albright offers predictably melodic, safe solos that, for the most part, fail to engage the listener." The Daily Breeze determined that Albright "turns in softly percussive, overly slick readings of soul-jazz mood pieces ... He ignores chances to improvise or offer inventive ideas." 

The Charlotte Observer deemed the album "Albright's breakthrough work," writing that "it's obvious Albright has put a lot of energy into this effort." The Buffalo News considered the music "full of slinky rhythms, gossamer textures and sensuous, lazy melodies."

AllMusic called the album "a tasty if somewhat typical journey through the land of quiet storm and light funk."

Track listing

References

1994 albums
Atlantic Records albums